The 56th Artillery Command is a two-star command of the United States Army  that serves as the Force Field Artillery Headquarters for U.S. Army Europe and Africa, with a mission to synchronize, integrate, and control fires and effects in support of the theater land component. The unit was originally formed on September 14, 1942 as the 56th Coast Artillery Brigade and has been reorganized and redesignated several times until its inactivation on June 30, 1991 following the reunification of Germany and the end of the Cold War.

United States Army Europe and Africa conducted the reactivation ceremony for the 56th Artillery Command on November 8, 2021 at Lucius D. Clay Kaserne, Wiesbaden, Germany. The 56th Artillery Command's headquarters in located in Mainz-Kastel and is commanded by Major General Stephen J. Maranian.

History

56th Coast Artillery Brigade 

The 56th Coast Artillery Brigade was organized in the Army of the United States on September 14, 1942 and over six months later, it was activated at Camp Stewart, Georgia on April 10, 1943.   The unit was reorganized and redesignated as the 56th Antiaircraft Artillery Brigade on May 28, 1943 and deployed to the European Theater for operations in World War II. The 56th deployed from England to Belgium and played a crucial role in the defense of the Allies’ most important port, Antwerp Harbor, from October 1944 to March 1945. The 56th defended the port from V-1 and V-2 rockets, conducting 24 hour operations during a 175 day bombardment. For the Defense of Antwerp Harbor, the Headquarters Battery earned two Belgian Army Order of the Day citations and the Belgian Fourragère. During World War Two, the 56th earned campaign participation credits for the Northern France, the Rhineland, and the Central Europe campaigns before participating in the occupation of Germany. Headquarters & Headquarters Battery is entitled to permanently display the Belgian Fourragère from the spearhead of its guidon.

The 56th was inactivated December 3, 1945 at Camp Shanks, New York.

56th Antiaircraft Artillery Brigade 

On February 10, 1951 the 56th Antiaircraft Artillery (AAA) Brigade was reactivated at Camp Edwards, Massachusetts and assigned to the United States First Army. On November 5, 1951 The 56th AAA Brigade transferred from Camp Edwards to Fort Devens, Massachusetts and was assigned to the Eastern Army Antiaircraft Command. They were then transferred to Fort Totten, New York on 24 January 1953. The unit transferred back to Fort Devens on 15 July 1956. They were redesignated as the 56th Air Defense Artillery Brigade on 20 March 1958.

The 56th Artillery Brigade was inactivated on December 24, 1964 in Coventry, Rhode Island.

56th Artillery Group/Brigade 

In April 18, 1963, the 56th Artillery Group was activated in Schwäbisch Gmünd, West Germany commanded by Col. Douglas C. France, Jr. The group prepared for the deployment of the new weapons system, the Pershing 1 nuclear missile. Headquarters & Headquarters Battery (HHB) was initially stationed at Hardt Kaserne (formerly Adolf Hitler Kaserne) and moved to Bismarck Kaserne in November 1968.

In 1965, the 56th Artillery Group assumed the critical role of a Quick Reaction Alert (QRA) force and was required to maintain an element of each unit at the highest level of combat readiness. These elements were designated to react within seconds of verified orders, and the entire command was to be fully operational within 2 hours of any alert activation. The increased requirements of the QRA mission necessitated some modifications to upgrade the Pershing missile system and caused the Army to increase the number of launchers at each battalion from four to 36.

The 56th Artillery Group was redesignated as the 56th Artillery Brigade on August 17, 1970. The brigade was authorized an increased level in command positions in the firing units. Platoon leaders were captains, battery commanders were majors, battalion commanders were lieutenant colonels and the brigade commander was a colonel.

With the split of the Artillery Branch into Field Artillery and Air Defense Artillery, the brigade was redesignated as the 56th Field Artillery Brigade on March 15, 1972.

56th Field Artillery Brigade 
The newly designated brigade was to command 1st Battalion, 41st Field Artillery Regiment, 1st Battalion, 81st Field Artillery Regiment, and 3rd Battalion, 84th Field Artillery Regiment as Pershing firing battalions. Also subordinate to the brigade was 2nd Battalion, 4th Infantry Regiment, tasked to provide defensive support to the firing units according to their security needs. A host of additional units provided support from medical to logistical, ensuring the brigade's ability to operate.

In November 1983, with the Soviets fully invested in the SS-20, and on the verge of bankruptcy, the Americans began fielding the Pershing II. By 1985 all three firing battalions were completely operational with Pershing II and the Soviet Union faced a threat they were financially unwilling to counter. On January 11, 1985 three soldiers, SSG John Leach, SGT Todd A. Zephier, and PFC Darryl L. Shirley of Battery C, 3rd Battalion, 84th Field Artillery were killed in an explosion at Camp Redleg, Heilbronn. The explosion occurred while removing a missile stage from the storage container during an assembly operation. An investigation revealed that the Kevlar rocket bottle had accumulated a triboelectric charge in the cold dry weather; as the engine was removed from the container the electrical charge began to flow and created a hot spot that ignited the propellant. A moratorium on missile movement was enacted through late 1986 when new grounding and handling procedures were put into place.

56th Field Artillery Command 
In January 1986, there was a major reorganization; the 56th Field Artillery Brigade was redesignated the 56th Field Artillery Command and authorized a major general as its commander. 1st Battalion, 81st Field Artillery inactivated and reformed as 1st Battalion, 9th Field Artillery in Neu-Ulm. 1st Battalion, 41st Field Artillery inactivated and reformed as 2nd Battalion, 9th Field Artillery in Schwäbisch-Gmünd. 3rd Battalion, 84th Field Artillery inactivated and reformed as 4th Battalion, 9th Field Artillery in Heilbronn. Along with 3rd Battalion, 9th Field Artillery at Fort Sill, the four firing units were then under the 9th Field Artillery Regiment. Additionally, the 55th Maintenance Battalion redesignated as 55th Support Battalion, E Company, 55th Maintenance Battalion deactivated and reformed as the 193rd Aviation Company, and the communications assets at each battery, were removed and consolidated into the 38th Signal Battalion.

Under the reorganization, the 56th Field Artillery Command would always report directly to the highest commander in Europe at the time. Therefore, during peacetime, they reported to the Commander in Chief of United States Army Europe (CINCUSAREUR), whereas, during heightened tension or war, command passed to NATO, with Allied Air Forces Central Europe as their next higher headquarters. Additionally, command levels for the field artillery batteries were increased by one grade over similar units. Platoons were commanded by a captain, and batteries by a major. Battalions continued to follow a lieutenant colonel while the command itself was led by a brigadier general and later a major general. These actions were meant to mitigate the increased responsibilities inherent with the mission they bore.

The Intermediate-Range Nuclear Forces Treaty was ratified on May 27, 1988. The firing batteries began to draw down their equipment as the missile launchers were destroyed. The Pershing first- and second-stage motors, reentry vehicles, warhead and radar section airframes were returned to Pueblo Depot Activity for elimination. On June 30, 1991, the 56th FA was inactivated, and "discontinued" on September 30, 1991.

Commanders
 April 1963: Colonel Douglas Carter France, Jr.
 August 1965: Colonel Rex H. Hampton, Sr.
 15 July 1967: Colonel Patrick William Powers
 November 1968: Colonel James Edward Convey, Jr.
 September 1970: Colonel Patrick William Powers; promoted to Brig. Gen.
 December 1972: Brigadier General Tom Judson Perkins; died 24 February 1973
 February 1973: Colonel Richard Donald Boyle; acting commander
 May 1973: Brigadier General Milton Eugene Key
 January 1975: Brigadier General Robert B. Hankins
 July 1978: Colonel Richard Donald Boyle; promoted to Brigadier General
 July 1980: Colonel Sidney Davis; promoted to Brigadier General 8 September 1980
 July 1982: Brigadier General William Earl Sweet
 1984: Brigadier General Raymond E. Haddock; promoted to Major General 4 August 1987
 1987: Brigadier General Roger K. Bean; promoted to Major General 24 August 1989

266th Chemical Detachment 

The 266th Chemical Detachment was activated as part of the 56th Field Artillery Brigade on 13 September 1972. The detachment was attached to Headquarters and Headquarters Battery, 56th Field Artillery Brigade and was garrisoned at Bismark Kaserne in Schwäbisch Gmünd.

55th Support Battalion 

The 55th Maintenance Battalion activated as part of the 56th Field Artillery Brigade in 1982. The 579th Ordnance Company deactivated and reformed as Headquarters Company and D Company. The three service batteries in the field artillery battalions deactivated and reformed as forward service companies A, B and C under the 55th. The aviation sections of each field artillery battalion reorganized as E Company.

38th Signal Battalion 

When the 56th FAC reorganized on 17 January 1986, the communication's sections from each of the subordinate field artillery battalions were consolidated into the reactivated 38th Signal Battalion. The subordinate units of the 38th were:
 Headquarters and Headquarters Company (HHC) in Schwäbisch Gmünd
 A Company supporting 2nd Battalion, 9th Field Artillery Regiment in Schwäbisch Gmünd
 B Company supporting 1st Battalion, 9th Field Artillery Regiment in Neu-Ulm
 C Company supporting 4th Battalion, 9th Field Artillery Regiment in Heilbronn
 D Company in Schwäbisch Gmünd

193rd Aviation Company 

Under the January 1986 reorganization, E Company, 55th Maintenance Battalion was deactivated and reformed as the 193rd Aviation Company at Cooke Barracks in Göppingen. The unit operated thirteen Bell UH-1 Iroquois helicopters. In June 1988, UH-1H airframe number 68-15387 of the 193rd struck a power line during low visibility conditions and crashed near Hittistetten, Senden, West Germany, killing three soldiers.

Decorations 

In 1968 the group created the Pershing Professionals Badge to recognize individual proficiency on the Pershing missile system. It was awarded through 1979.

The Superior Unit Award was presented to the 56th Field Artillery Command and its subordinate units for service during the Pershing II fielding, 1 November 1983 through 31 December 1986.

Twenty-first century 
On August 12, 2021, U.S. Army Europe and Africa announced that the commnad would be reactivated in October 2021 as the 56th Artillery Command. The two-star Theater Fires Command is led by MG Stephen J. Maranian and headquartered in Mainz-Kastel, near the Army's four-star headquarters in Wiesbaden.

Subordinate units 

April 1963
 Headquarters and Headquarters Battery (HHB)
 4th Battalion, 41st Field Artillery Regiment (4-41st FAR)
 1st Battalion, 81st Field Artillery Regiment (1-81st FAR)
 3rd Battalion, 84th Field Artillery Regiment (3-84th FAR)

September 1970
 Headquarters and Headquarters Battery (HHB)
 4th Battalion, 41st Field Artillery Regiment (4-41st FAR)
 1st Battalion, 81st Field Artillery Regiment (1-81st FAR)
 3rd Battalion, 84th Field Artillery Regiment (3-84th FAR)
 2nd Battalion, 4th Infantry Regiment

September 1972
 Headquarters and Headquarters Battery (HHB)
 266th Chemical Detachment
 1st Battalion, 41st Field Artillery Regiment (1-41st FAR)
 1st Battalion, 81st Field Artillery Regiment (1-81st FAR)
 3rd Battalion, 84th Field Artillery Regiment (3-84th FAR)
 2nd Battalion, 4th Infantry Regiment

1982
 Headquarters and Headquarters Battery (HHB)
 266th Chemical Detachment
 1st Battalion, 41st Field Artillery Regiment (1-41st FAR)
 1st Battalion, 81st Field Artillery Regiment (1-81st FAR)
 3rd Battalion, 84th Field Artillery Regiment (3-84th FAR)
 2nd Battalion, 4th Infantry Regiment
 55th Maintenance Battalion

January 1986 - May 1991
 Headquarters and Headquarters Battery (HHB)
 266th Chemical Detachment
 1st Battalion, 9th Field Artillery Regiment (1-9th FAR)
 2nd Battalion, 9th Field Artillery Regiment (2-9th FAR)
 4th Battalion, 9th Field Artillery Regiment (4-9th FAR)
 2nd Battalion, 4th Infantry Regiment
 55th Support Battalion
 193rd Aviation Company
 38th Signal Battalion

October 2021
 Headquarters and Headquarters Battery (HHB)
 2nd Multi-Domain Task Force (MDTF)

In popular culture 
  The character is wearing the inverted insignia of the 56th Field Artillery Command.
  The gatefold photo has four of the band members wearing the insignia of the 56th Field Artillery Command.
  A fictionalized of a Stasi agent who infiltrates the West German command during the fielding of Pershing II in 1983. The commander of the 56th Field Artillery Command is Maj. Gen. Arnold Jackson, shown wearing the unit insignia. In real life this would have been Brig. Gen. William Earl Sweet.

Heraldry

Shoulder sleeve insignia 
Description. On a disc shaped embroidered item edged with a 1/8 inch (.32 cm) White border, upon a torteau and between two lightning bolts chevronwise Or, a stylized missile ascending palewise Sable, emitting fire Gules, all edged Argent, and a demi-cloud in base of the last. The overall dimensions are 3 inches (7.62 cm) in diameter.

Symbolism: Scarlet and gold (yellow) are the colors used for Field Artillery; blue denotes the assigned infantry support. The destructive power and target capability of the missile are suggested by the red disc at center and the upright missile signifies the readiness of the unit. The lightning flashes refer to the ability of the missile team to act and strike quickly in event of need.

Background: The shoulder sleeve insignia was originally approved for the 56th Artillery Brigade on 9 June 1971. It was redesignated for the 56th Field Artillery Brigade on 7 April 1972. The insignia was redesignated effective 17 January 1986 for the 56th Field Artillery Command. It was redesignated for the 56th Artillery Command on 4 August 2021.

Previous insignia: From 1963 to 1970, the authorized shoulder sleeve insignia was the emblem of the Seventh United States Army. From 1970 to 1971, the Pershing tab was worn with the Seventh Army insignia.

Distinctive unit insignia 

The distinctive unit insignia (DUI) was authorized for wear only for Headquarters and Headquarters Battery (HHB).

2021- 
Description: A gold metal device 1 3/16 inches (3.02 cm) in height overall, consisting of a trilobated cloud Gules throughout, bearing and upon two cannons in saltire, points to chief, a domed tower Argent with an archway Sable (as depicted on the coat of arms of the city of Antwerp, Belgium) surmounted on a field fesswise in base Vert. Overall in base, a semi-circular Gold scroll inscribed “QUICK RELIABLE ACCURATE” in Black letters.

Symbolism: Scarlet and yellow (gold) are the colors used for Field Artillery. The trilobated cloud symbolizes the Headquarters and Headquarters Battery, 56th Field Artillery Brigade’s Northern France, Central Europe and Rhineland Campaigns during World War II. The crossed cannons with the Antwerp Tower allude to the Headquarters Battery’s two Belgian Army Order of the Day Citations, the Belgian Fourragere for action at Antwerp and the Defense of Antwerp Harbor. Red and green are the colors of the Belgian Fourragere. The “Pershing Missile” alludes to the unique mission of the unit as a participant in the Army’s first Nuclear Strike Force with missiles on constant alert (QRA).

Background: The distinctive unit insignia was originally approved for the 56th Field Artillery Brigade on 11 April 1972. It was redesignated effective 17 January 1986 for the 56th Field Artillery Command. It was redesignated for the 56th Artillery Command on 4 August 2021.

1972 
Description: A gold color metal and enamel device  in height overall consisting of a scarlet background with a trilobated cloud at the top bearing two black crossed cannons behind a white domed tower with black archway, (as depicted on the coat of arms of the city of Antwerp, Belgium) on a green base, surmounted overall by a vertical gold Pershing missile; all above a semi-circular gold scroll inscribed "Quick Reliable Accurate" in black letters.

Symbolism: Scarlet and yellow (gold) are the colors used for Field Artillery. The trilobated cloud symbolizes the Headquarters and Headquarters Battery, 56th Field Artillery Brigade's Northern France, Central Europe and Rhineland Campaigns during World War II. The crossed cannons with the Antwerp Tower allude to the Headquarters Battery's two Belgian Army Order of the Day Citations, the Belgian Fourragere for action at Antwerp and the Defense of Antwerp Harbor. Red and green are the colors of the Belgian Fourragere. The Pershing missile alludes to the unique mission of the unit as a participant in the Army's first nuclear strike force with missiles on constant alert (QRA).

Background: The distinctive unit insignia was originally approved for the 56th Field Artillery Brigade on 11 April 1972. It was redesignated effective 17 January 1986 for the 56th Field Artillery Command.

Note: The older DUI was worn from 1967 to 1972.

1968 
Description: A gold colored metal and enamel device  in height overall, vesica on top and ovaloid in base consisting of a gold missile with billowing white exhaust behind and between two vertical gold cannon firing black bomb bursts on a red background. All arched by a gold nebuly and encircled in base by a gold scroll bearing the inscription "QUICK, RELIABLE, ACCURATE" in black letters.

Symbolism: Scarlet is the color used for Artillery. The cannon barrels symbolize the basic mission of the organization. The missile alludes to the "Pershing Missile" and to the unique mission of the unit as a participant in the Army's first Nuclear Strike Force with missiles on constant alert (QRA).

Background: The distinctive unit insignia was approved on 24 September 1968. It was rescinded on 14 February 1975.

References

Bibliography 

 
 

056
056
Military units and formations disestablished in 1991
056
056
Pershing missile
Military units and formations established in 1942
1942 establishments in the United States